Harry Evan Williams  (7 September 1867 – 24 May 1918) was an oratorio tenor. He recorded almost one hundred 78-RPM records for the Victor Talking Machine Company in the United States and The Gramophone Company (HMV) in England. Williams  gave more than 1,000 performances and recitals during his 25-year professional career across the United States and in England and Wales. Williams was praised most highly by critics for his interpretations of Handel.

Biography
Evan Williams was born on 7 September 1867 in Mineral Ridge, Ohio, the son of David Williams and Gwendolyn Harris. His parents were recent poor Welsh immigrants from Pembrokeshire, Wales. They were married in 1867 in Trumbull County, Ohio. When Evan  was 13 years old, his Mother died in childbirth, and he was sent to live with his aunt and uncle, Thomas and Sarah Davis in Thomastown, a Welsh immigrant mining community near Akron, Ohio.

While he was working in his youth in coal mines in the Akron area, the quality of his voice was discovered when he was singing in a local church choir. He began voice lessons with Madame Louise Von Feilitsch in Cleveland. He began rising to prominence as a singer when he participated in a Welsh choir in Galion, Ohio, in 1891. By 1894 he was performing  in London and began dividing his career between appearances in the United Kingdom and in the United States. At this time in his career he was hired to be the soloist at the Marble Collegiate Church in New York City.  He was reputed to be the highest-paid church singer in the world at the time. In 1896 he gave his first performance at the well known  Worcester Music Festival in Worcester, Massachusetts. In 1907 he returned to the United States for most of the rest of his performing career, where he sang as a tenor soloist for various choral societies and in concerts all over the country. His recording career with Victor Red Seal records was very successful.

Williams was a great draw at many music societies and events, among them the Orpheus Club of Springfield, Massachusetts, from the 1890s until his death in 1918.

He died on 24 May 1918 in Akron, Ohio from blood poisoning, the result of a boil.

Family
Evan Williams was married on October 18, 1888 to Margaret Jane née Morgan "Nona" Williams in Thomastown, Ohio.  She was the daughter of Welsh immigrant parents Levi Morgan and Ann Williams.  They had four children:
 Vernon (1889–1945) was also a tenor and voice teacher.
 Edgar (1892–1963) was a lawyer.
 H. Evan Jr (1899–1954) became a newspaper journalist.
 Gwendolyn (1909–1972).

H. Evan Williams had five grandchildren, one of whom Edgar Morgan Williams Jr of Cambridge, Maryland—survives as of 2020. He also has 13 great-grandchildren.

Recordings
Williams voice recorded prodigiously for the Victor Talking Machine Company and he was reported to be the  Victor Company's third most popular recording artist after Enrico Caruso and John McCormack as ranked by total record sales. His two best selling titles were "Open the Gates of the Temple"  and "A Perfect Day".  For two publicly available (pre-1923) recordings of his singing, click  and —both composed by Carrie Jacobs-Bond (1862–1946). Evan Williams also made many records for Victor's British affiliate, His Master's Voice (HMV).

Legacy
According to his obituary in The New York Times, Williams was fondly remembered for his singing of "Tim Rooney's at the Fighting" to audiences of soldiers during World War I.
H. Evan Williams is buried in Ohio's East Akron Cemetery in the Williams family plot. The gravestone on Evan Williams grave reads:
God grew near to his children through the singing heart of Evan Williams.  A world that laughs and loves and sings has enshrined the memory of this gentle soul whose song restored and brightened the deep places.

An antique oil portrait of Evan Williams was given in 2009 by his descendants to the University of Akron. In his lifetime Evan Williams was sculpted by the famous American sculptor Jo Davidson. ( It was said at the time about celebrities that they were not truly  famous unless Davidson had sculpted them)

Evan Williams' family house still stands as of 2020.  He built the substantial house circa 1914 at 105 Mayfield Avenue in Akron with his record royalties and concert proceeds.  It  was quite commodious and had a billiard room and a music room with a Mason and Hamlin piano and also a lovely rose garden.  After Evan Williams' premature death in 1918, his widow Nona built a smaller house in the side lot at 97 Mayfield Avenue where she subsequently moved. She died in 1944.

Evan Williams performed at the White House at a State Dinner hosted by  President and Mrs.Taft in 1910. The Tafts were also from Ohio and were introduced to Williams by  U.S. Senator and Mrs. Charles W.F. Dick of Akron, whose daughter Grace Amelia later married Williams's son Edgar Morgan in 1917.

References

External links
 Evan Williams recordings at the Discography of American Historical Recordings.

1867 births
1918 deaths
American coal miners
19th-century American male singers
19th-century American singers
American tenors
Deaths from sepsis
Deaths from skin disease
Singers from Ohio
American people of Welsh descent
Classical musicians from Ohio